Samaria (Mitcham) Bailey is an African-American woman who is known as an instrumental figure in the civil rights movement. Bailey began desegregation at A. L. Miller Senior High School, an all-white female school located in Macon, Georgia. She would go on to become one of the first African American women accepted to Mercer University.  She later became an accomplished pianist, and her story was adapted into a bestselling novel and a stage play.

Early life 

The second of ten children, Samaria Mitcham was born in Macon on June 29, 1947 to a proud, hardworking family. Her father, Wilbur Mitcham, was the family breadwinner, working as a cook at a fashionable restaurant in Macon.  After the children in Samaria's family were grown, Samaria's mother returned to school and graduated from Wesleyan College. She is the elder sister of “The Gay Preacher’s Wife” author Lydia Meredith.

In 1964, Samaria was a junior at Appling High School, a traditionally black — and therefore coed — institution.

Desegregating Miller High School 

Historically, white students in Macon had attended separate, gender-segregated schools. High schools for black students, on the other hand, were coeducational.  As the school desegregation movement began to pick up steam, black students in the twelfth grade were placed in the traditionally white schools: Miller High School for girls and Lanier High School for boys.

At Appling, the school administration considered Samaria an "academic gemstone," earning "straight-As" despite extensive extracurricular studies in (among others) chorus, band, and drama.  But Samaria did not feel challenged enough, and, when students were asked to apply to enter Miller or Lanier, Samaria was among the first to volunteer.

Samaria was one of the only nonwhite students at Miller High. Still, Samaria was regarded as a good and intelligent young woman, and graduated with honors.

Tutoring Program 
Samaria also helped to develop one of the first anti-discrimination programs for her fellow students. Black students who were attempting to transfer to the ethnically white schools were required to be "academically prepared"; therefore, black students received preparatory summer tutoring. Nonetheless, eleven years of underperforming education would not be erased with a single summer of tutoring and a year of improved schooling. Black students applying to college still displayed much lower scores on standardized tests.

In order to combat these disadvantages, Joseph Hendricks, then Dean of Men at Mercer University, created a secret tutoring program for black high school students, to help prepare them to succeed in the newly-desegregated schools. Although the tutoring took place at Mercer, the program was not sponsored by the university itself.

Hendricks carefully selected the first seventeen students, one of whom was the young student Samaria Mitcham. Samaria was tutored in the summer with the rest of the group and academically flourished the following school year. Nonetheless, when testing came, Samaria performed poorly. Samaria's situation provided a convincing argument that the standardized test scores did not reflect students' academic abilities. Samaria's star performance at each high school demonstrated her intelligence; the tests had instead measured the cultural literacy white students had acquired through years of superior education.

Based on Samaria's experiences, Hendricks improved the tutoring program, recruiting students from as far as UCLA to help teach.  The following summer (1965), the tutorial program attracted close to 100 students.

Desegregating Mercer University 
Samaria was then admitted to Mercer University, the first such African American woman.  At Mercer, Samaria continued to endure racist remarks from her peers on a daily basis. Most students ignored her, avoiding eye contact, and even some professors treated her like a nonentity.  In her chemistry class, she was the only female pupil, and the professor had to force another student to be her lab partner.  The mistreatment, however, did not stop Samaria from pursuing her education.  She notes, "I've never been a quitter."

During her time at Mercer, Samaria continued to perform as a pianist.  She was offered recording contracts with several music labels, but rejected them to continue pursuing her education.

Later life and occupation 
After graduation, Bailey started Med-Tech Service, a medical technologies company.  Med-Tech Service employs forty to fifty people, providing nurses, technicians, and other health- care providers throughout the Macon area.  Samaria has described her ideology as follows: "I was never a separatist. I was never a black militant. I just always wanted to get the job done."  Indeed, ninety percent of her employees are white.

As of 2014, Samaria Bailey resided with her husband in Macon, Georgia.

References

Further reading 

Tribute to Girls of Courage
Remembering The Civil Rights Movement
"Bibb school integration ‘like invading somebody’s home,' trailblazer recalls" from The Telegraph
Stem of Jesse: The Costs of Community at a 1960s Southern School on Google Books
Combustible/Burn on Google Books

1947 births
Living people
Mercer University alumni
Activists for African-American civil rights